Elections to Preston City Council took place on 5 May 2016, the same day as other local elections. The council is elected in thirds, which means one councillor from each three-member ward and selected councillors from a number of two-member wards are elected each year, followed by one year free from any elections to ensure all councillors serve a full term.

Due to the "in thirds" system, the 2016 election results below are directly compared with the corresponding elections in 2012, with the change in vote share calculated on this basis.

Summary

Council Composition

Prior to the election, the composition of the council was:

After the election, the composition was:

Ward results

Ashton

Brookfield

Cadley

Deepdale

Fishwick

Garrison

Greyfriars

Ingol

Larches

Lea

Rural East

Rural North

Ribbleton

Riversway

Sharoe Green

St George's
There was no election in St George's ward because of an uncontested poll.

St Matthew's

Town Centre

Tulketh

External links
Local Elections 2016 Preston City Council

References

2016 English local elections
2016
2010s in Lancashire